Medri Bahri (English: Land of the Sea Kingdom), also known as Mereb Melash, was an Eritrean kingdom emerged in 1137 until conquest by the Ethiopian Empire in 1879. It was situated in modern-day Eritrea, and was ruled by a Negassi (at times also called the Bahri Negasi, Bahr Negash in Amharic, Najassi in Arabic, or "king of the sea" in English).
 
In 1680, Medri-Bahri’s political process was described by the German scholar J. Ludolph as being a republican monarchy. This republican political process was found no where else in the Horn of Africa and was distinct to the kingdom of Medri Bahri.

History

Overview

The Kingdom was formed after the demise of Aksumite Empire in the 9th century and retained all the Aksumite regions north to the Mereb river, namely, Bahr, Buri, Bogos, Serawye and Hamassien, while the regions south to the river fell under the control of the Agaw people and became part of the Zagwe dynasty.

It's reign lasted until the invasion of the Yohannes IV of Tembien in 1879. It survived several major threats like the Ethiopian-Adal war and the Ottoman Red Sea expansion, albeit the Kingdom irretrievably lost its access to the Red Sea due to the latter. The relation to the neighboring Ethiopian Empire in the south varied from time to time, ranging from vassal state, to peaceful alliance and even all out war. The first residence of the Negassi is believed to have remained in Adulis, but evidence is scant, it is however well documented that in the 16th century the center of power was in Debarwa, which fell in disuse in the 17th century when power shifted to the town of Tsazega due to the same-named clan taking control of the kingdom.

16th century

After the Aksumite empire, the area from the Eritrean highlands to the Red Sea was known as Ma'ikele Bahr ("between the seas/rivers," i.e. the land between the Red Sea and the Mereb river). It was later renamed as the domain of the Bahr Negash ("Ruler of the sea"), the Medri Bahri ("Land of the Sea", "Sea land" in Tigrinya, although it included some areas like Shire on the other side of the Mereb, today in Ethiopia).  The entire coastal domain of Ma'ikele Bahri was under the Adal Sultanate during the reign of Sultan Badlay. The first time the title Bahr Negash appears is during the reign of emperor Zara Yaqob (r. 1433-1468), after his reconquest on behalf of the Ethiopian Empire, who perhaps even introduced that office. His chronicle explains how he put much effort into increasing the power of that office, placing the Bahr Negash above other local chiefs and eventually making him the sovereign of a territory covering the Shire, a region south of the Mareb river in what is now Ethiopia, The highlands of what is now Eritrea including Hamasien and Seraye. To strengthen the imperial presence in Medri Bahri, Zara Yaqob also established a military colony consisting of Maya warriors from the south of his realm.

In the 1520s, Medri Bahri was described by the Portuguese traveller and priest Francisco Alvares. The current Bahr Negash bore the name Dori and resided in Debarwa, a town on the very northern edge of the highlands. Dori was an uncle of emperor Lebna Dengel, to whom he paid tribute. These tributes were traditionally paid with horses and imported cloth and carpets. Dori was said to wield considerable power and influence, with his kingdom reaching almost as far north as Suakin, plus he was also a promoter of Christianity, gifting the churches everything they needed. By the time of Alvares' visit, Dori was engaged in warfare against some Nubians after the latter had killed his son. The Nubians were known as robbers and generally had a rather bad reputation. They originated somewhere five to six days away from Medri Bahri, possibly Taka (a historical province named after Jebel Taka near modern Kassala).

The Bahre-Nagassi ("Kings of the Sea") alternately fought with or against the Abyssinians (modern day Ethiopia) and the neighbouring Muslim Adal Sultanate depending on the geopolitical circumstances. Medri Bahri was thus part of the Christian resistance against Imam Ahmad ibn Ibrahim al-Ghazi of Adal's forces, but later joined the Adalite states and the Ottoman Empire front against Abyssinia in 1572. During the 16th century said Ottomans also began making inroads in the Red Sea area.
The territory became an Ottoman province or eyalet known as the Habesh Eyalet. Massawa served as the new province's first capital. When the city became of secondary economic importance, the administrative capital was soon moved across the Red Sea to Jeddah. Its headquarters remained there from the end of the 16th century to the early 19th century, with Medina temporarily serving as the capital in the 18th century. Turks briefly occupied the highland parts of Baharnagash in 1559 and withdrew after they encountered resistance and pushed back by the Bahrnegash and highland forces. In 1578 they tried to expand into the highlands with the help of Bahr negus Yeshaq who had switched alliances due to power struggle, and by 1589 they were defeated by the Ethiopian Emperor Sarsa Dengel. After that Ottomans abandoned their ambitions to establish themselves on the highlands and remained in the lowlands until they left the region by 1872.

17th century-1890

The Scottish traveler James Bruce reported in 1770 that Medri Bahri was a distinct political entity from Abyssinia, noting that the two territories were frequently in conflict.

In 1831 the ethnic Amhara warlord Wube Haile Maryam conquered and ruled the Tigrinya speaking provinces of Tigray and parts of modern day Eritrea. Wube controlled significant parts of the Medri Bahri such as Akele Guzai. Wube and his army even reached the Bogos area, a dependency of the Hamasen lords of the Mereb Mellash. Wube was thus able to control all the caravan routes to the Red Sea, although his claim to the Ottoman port of Massawa was unsuccessful. Wube is remembered in Eritrea and Tigray as a ruthless and brutal warlord.
 
The kingdom was conquered by Ethiopia in 1879, when Ras Alula seized control of the region after he betrayed Ras Woldemichael Solomon and imprisoned him. The region then became an Italian colony in 1890.

Geography

At its peak, the Kingdom of Medri Bahri stretched from the Red Sea to the Mareb River and beyond, covering areas of Shire (Including Inda Selassie) and its surrounding regions. This vast region was subdivided into three main provinces, namely Akele Guzai, Hamassien and Serae. Of these three, Serae was the most politically important district, as the most influential and important people took up residence there. As a consequence, this was also the wealthiest, the best maintained and the best protected district. In the language of Tigrinya language "Medri Bahri" means "Land of the Sea" in reference to the Red Sea which Eritrea has a long coastline of this sea. This kingdom had a border to the south with Tigray Region, a province of the Ethiopian Empire also known as Abyssinia.

Demographics
Medri Bahri was composed of the following modern ethnic groups: Tigrinya people, Bilen people, Saho people, Tigre people, and the Irob people.

Notable people 
Bahr Negus Yeshaq
Woldemichael Solomon
Bahta Hagos

Notes

References

Further reading

History of Eritrea
Former kingdoms